The Fishery Survey of India (FiSI), founded in 1983 by the Government of India's Ministry of Agriculture & Farmers Welfare, for the fisheries studies, research and survey of the traditional and deep sea fisheries of India within India's Exclusive economic zone, is tasked with the preparation of an annual Fishery Resources Survey and "Assessment and Research Programme" for the sustainable fishery requirements of traditional fishermen, small and medium boat operators and industrial fleet of deep-sea longlining tuna fishing.

History

FiSI, founded in 1983, has its origin in the establishment of "Deep Sea Fishing Station" pilot project 
by government in 1946. In 1974 it was renamed "Exploratory Fisheries Project" and granted the status of an institute. In 1983, after Exclusive economic zone (EEZ) come into force by UNCLS in 1982, the institute was renamed "Fishery Survey of India" and designated a national institute. In 2005 the Marine Engineering Division was transferred to FiSI from NIFPHATT. In 2016, the institute moved to its new headquarter at Sassoon Dock of Colaba in Mumbai. On 27 July 2017, "Deep Sea Fishing Project" was launched by Prime Minister Narendra Modi to end the bottom trawling fishing by providing incentives to 2,000 trawlers from Palk Bay to diversify into deep sea fishing.

Importance

India, with 8,118km coastline, 2 million square kilometres Exclusive economic zone including 530,000km2 continental shelf and 6.3% of the world fisheries production, is second largest fisheries producer after China with 9.58 million tonnes total production and 1.05 million tonnes export worth INR 334.4 billion (US$5.57 billion) export revenue, with marine fishing constituting 35% share, 70% from west coast and 30% from east coast (2014-2015). India has 14 million people employed in fisheries, including 1.9 million fishermen with 80,000 mechanised fishing vessels, 75,000 motorised fishing boats and 50,000 traditional non-motorised fishing boats.

The largest output producer states are Andhra Pradesh 20%, West Bengal 15%, Gujarat 8%, Kerala 7%, Maharashtra 6% and Tamil Nadu 6% (2014-2015). Among processed exports, major exports are tuna, prawns, squid and cuttlefish. Export volumes and values respectively are: frozen shrimp 31% and 64%, fresh and frozen fish 33% and 14.2%, frozen squid 9% and 6%, and frozen cuttlefish 7% and 5%.

The largest importers of Indian fisheries output are USA 26%, ASEAN nations 26%, European Union 20% (export to UK will increase due to 2016 Brexit), Japan 9%, Middle East nations 6% and China 4%. 

After the discovery of additional fishing resources in the annual surveys, the government has undertaken schemes to increase deep sea fishing to enhance the total output.

Capabilities
As of 2016, FiSi has a fleet of 11 ocean survey vessels for Fishery Resources Survey spread across 6 major ports of India, with a total of 752 employees across India.

References

External links
 Comprehensive third-party report on FiSI, 2016.

See also 

 Fishing in India
 Ports in India
 Overfishing
 Environmental impact of fishing

Citations 

 
Aquaculture in India
Fisheries agencies
Government agencies established in 1983
1983 establishments in Maharashtra
Ministry of Agriculture & Farmers' Welfare